SNCF 232.P.1 was an experimental prototype high-pressure steam locomotive ordered by the Chemins de fer du Nord, but delivered to the Société nationale des chemins de fer français (SNCF) in 1939.  It was the first and only member of SNCF's first class of 4-6-4 or Hudson type of locomotives.

Origins 
The locomotive was ordered by on 9 March 1936 by the Chemins de fer du Nord in an attempt to improve on the power output and fuel consumption of the conventional steam locomotive.

The project involved three of the French big-four locomotive manufacturers: Société alsacienne de constructions méchaniques (SACM); Fives-Lille; and Schneider et Cie. It also received assistance from the Swiss Locomotive and Machine Works (SLM) of Winterthur, which made the design and delivered the boiler and the steam motors.

Description 
It was decided to fit the locomotive with a high-pressure boiler and multiple small steam motors to drive each axle

There were six, three-cylinder,  steam motors, which were attached, two per axle, to the driving axles by gearing. The small motors were less bulky, had a higher power-weight ratio and were more efficient.

The Direction du Matériel et de la Traction (service MT) (Rolling Stock and Traction Department) believed that the small motors could easily be disconnected and would not immobilise the locomotive.

Due to the absence of connecting rods, the locomotive had outside frames and an integral fairing.

Service history 
The locomotive left the Graffenstaden works of SACM in the early days of 1939 and testing started immediately.  However, the outbreak of World War II quickly interrupted these tests; the locomotive was sent to workshops at Oullins where it went into storage. The tests resumed in 1943, and after a presentation at the Oullins Workshops in 1946 and a series of measurements taken on the Vitry-sur-Seine test plant in 1947, the locomotive went back into store.  Placed awaiting authorisation for retirement in 1948, it was finally withdrawn in 1949.

Conclusion 
The design had to answer the desire to increase the efficiency or reduce the consumption for the same power. However, the delay caused by the World War II, the fact that the boiler was more complex, and the difficulty of maintaining the main boiler at very high pressure made the gains obtained, viz., fuel economy in the order of 30%, meant that the design had no impact on future steam locomotives.

Tender 

References

Steam locomotives of France
232.P
4-6-4 locomotives
High-pressure steam locomotives
SACM locomotives
Railway locomotives introduced in 1939
Individual locomotives of France
Standard gauge locomotives of France
Scrapped locomotives
Streamlined steam locomotives 
Passenger locomotives
Experimental locomotives